Jet Donald La'ala  is an Indonesian football defender who played for Indonesia in the 2000 Asian Cup. He also played for Palu Putra, Pupuk Kaltim Bontang, PSM Makassar, Persija Jakarta, Persmin Minahasa, Pesma Manado.

External links

11v11 Profile

1971 births
Living people
Indonesian footballers
Association football defenders
Indonesia international footballers
21st-century Indonesian people